is a Japanese manga series written and illustrated by Lynn Okamoto. It was originally serialized in Shueisha's Weekly Young Jump from June 2002 to August 2005, with the 107 chapters collected into twelve tankōbon volumes. Elfen Lied revolves around the interactions, views, emotions, and differences between human beings and the Diclonii, a mutant species similar to humans in build but distinguishable by two horns on their heads and "vectors", transparent telekinetically controlled arms that have the power to manipulate and cut objects within their reach. The series is centered on the teenage Diclonius girl "Lucy" who was rejected by human beings and subsequently wants revenge.

The series' title is German for "Elves' Song" or more formally "song of the elves'" and takes its name from the song "Elfenlied", which is featured in the story. Elfen Lied involves themes of discrimination, social alienation, identity, prejudice, revenge, abuse, jealousy, regret, and the value of humanity. It is also noted for the graphic violence, emotional themes of how the characters change through, and the overall transgressive subject matter of the whole story.

A 13-episode anime television series adaptation was produced by the studio Arms and broadcast on AT-X from July to October 2004. The anime finished airing before the manga was complete; as a result, the plot differed between the two, especially the ending. The manga is licensed in North America by Dark Horse Comics. The anime series has been licensed in North America by ADV Films and in Australia by Madman Entertainment.

Plot and characters

Elfen Lied takes place in Kamakura and Kanagawa, and focuses on the "Diclonius", a newly mutated species. Their appearance is similar to humans, but with several differences, namely horn-like protrusions on the forehead and the presence of telekinetic invisible arms called "Vectors". One such Diclonius, Lucy, is the main character of the series: Initially held in a facility built for experimentation, located off the coast of Kamakura, she manages to escape and wreak havoc, but is injured in the process, an event which causes her to develop a secondary, childlike personality known as Nyu.

Lucy is found by two locals, Kouta, who studies at the local university, and his cousin Yuka. They take her in, and become involved with the numerous, often brutal, attempts to recapture her by a Special Assault Team and a number of other Diclonius, who shift frequently from oblivious to murderous.

Diclonius
Much of the plot of Elfen Lied revolves around the Diclonii species, which strongly resemble humans; the only obvious difference is the two horn-like protrusions extending from the temporal bone and parietal bone regions of the skull.

Diclonii powers involve the use of invisible arms, known as "vectors", that can grasp and impact things as if they are solid, but also become insubstantial and pass through objects. They can slice objects as well, which is how Diclonii usually kill their victims. Vectors usually have a limited range of a few meters, but the length varies among each Diclonius. Diclonii also demonstrate the ability to sense one another.

A key point of debate throughout the series is the Diclonius propensity towards violence. Many have a vendetta against humans, and have ambitions to wipe out the human race and populate the world with their own species. It is disputed and contradicted during the series as to how Diclonii develop their violent behavior, whether it is part of their genetic code or whether it stems from abuse by humans.

If a Diclonius vector penetrates or even so much as touches a human male body, the "vector virus" is transferred to the human, causing their children to be born as Diclonii (when born from humans, they are called "Silpelits"). An incident involving the escape of a child Diclonius during Kurama's early years, where the Diclonius' vectors penetrated him without causing him pain, resulted in Mariko being born a Diclonius and Kurama taking precautions against a recurrence by urging Bando to be sterilized. All Diclonii (Silpelits) born from human parents are sterile and female. There is only one Diclonius that is actually capable of reproducing: Lucy, the "queen".

Production

Anime
When Elfen Lied was being adapted into an anime series, director Mamoru Kanbe was recommended to work on the series by the series composer, Takao Yoshioka. Yoshioka believed that Kanbe's general drawing style and composition would be ideal to adapt the manga, still in publication at the time, into an anime series.  Kanbe himself, originally reluctant about joining the production, gained interest in it upon reading the manga.

While the manga was still ongoing at the time, Kanbe and the production team were forced to condense the plot of the series into thirteen episodes, even though they felt it was necessary to make more as several significant plot details in the manga which Kanbe felt he could have used to make the series more emotive were left out.

According to Kanbe, he considered Elfen Lied as a "love story," and he wanted to "bring viewers to tears."  Thus, he made attempts throughout the series to provide a contrast of emotions, commenting that he could make the violence exemplify this throughout the series.  The production team were originally surprised by Okamoto's choice of Kamakura as a setting for the series; however, after several visits to the area, Kanbe commented that the setting in Kamakura was, according to the production team, ideal for the poignant and reflective drama in the series to unfold, as its general tranquility and geography made for a reflective and yet eerie, deep-meaning backdrop to the series.  This can be seen in several examples, such as on top of a set of steps overlooking the coastline, where many of the interactions between characters take place.  This is used as an important device in conveying the ideas of memory and emotional association, such as the contrast between Kohta and Lucy's conversation when they were ten years old in comparison with their conversation in the final episode.

Style and themes
In comments made by director Mamoru Kanbe on the Elfen Lied website, he stated that he intended for the anime to question and discuss values relating to the way in which humans divide each other by difference, as well as the belief that atrocities such as those committed by Lucy in the series are strongly influenced by the way in which people are treated by their fellow beings.  The series frequently discusses the events and treatment which define the human character in such a way, and the problems which arise from discrimination, as well as the wild contrasts between compassion and vengeance between fellow humans, through the strong vengeance of Lucy compared with her past memory of Kohta.  Many of the themes are mentioned at the teasers at the ends of episodes.

Themes such as genocide and the attempts to "purify" the earth from each other also appear in the anime. Both Diclonius and the human species feel the need to populate the earth with their own and wipe the other out. Kanbe quoted this in relation to the desire of humans to cast each other out and segregate one another.

Throughout the series, there is a great deal of blood and gore, graphic violence as well as psychological violence. One of the most prevalent motifs of the series is the humanity of the Diclonius, especially contrasted against the inhumanity of ordinary people. One reviewer described the series as "devoted to quite a few of the darker, more callous factors of human nature." Throughout the series there are various incidences of casual beatings, cruel experimentation, and outright killing. Also, animal cruelty is present when three young boys mercilessly beat Lucy's puppy until it dies; though the act is off-screen, a copious amount of blood is shown; which drives Lucy to murder the bullies out of revenge and insanity.

 Most of the episodes contain graphic violence, including instances of torture and at one point the series addresses consequences of the rape of a child. The series also includes scenes that present female nudity and strong language (specifically in the English dub). The series juxtaposes many different tones and genres and was described by Bamboo Dong of Anime News Network as "mixing insane amounts of violence with a heavy dose of ultracuteness." The series balances its darker themes with romantic sub-plots as well as many comic moments. Elfen Lied has been described as similar to, or borrowing elements from Chobits, 3x3 Eyes and Gunslinger Girl.

Cultural references
The opening and ending sequences feature artistic drawings of the principal characters. These characters are drawn in a style based on Gustav Klimt's paintings,  including The Kiss, Adele Bloch-Bauer I, and others with similar imitating poses, colors, and patterns. In promotional art as well as in the series itself, characters make use of a famous El Greco hand symbol of outstretched fingers with the middle and ring fingers connected. The song Elfenlied ("Elf Song") appears in the manga and is credited to the composer Hugo Wolf. A poem by Eduard Mörike is the basis for Wolf's version. It is taught to Nyu by the manga-only protagonist Nozomi.

Media

Manga

Written and illustrated by Lynn Okamoto, Elfen Lied was serialized in Shueisha's seinen manga magazine Weekly Young Jump from June 6, 2002, to August 25, 2005. Shueisha collected its 107 chapters in twelve tankōbon volumes released from October 18, 2002, to November 18, 2005.

The manga has been licensed by Dark Horse Comics in North America, who published the series in a four-volume omnibus edition from May 22, 2019, to September 9, 2020.

Anime

A 13-episode anime television series was directed by Mamoru Kanbe, animated by Arms and produced by Genco and VAP. The series' author, Lynn Okamoto, has a brief cameo appearance as a guest in episode 12. Elfen Lied first aired on TV Tokyo's AT-X satellite channel from July 25 to October 17, 2004, and was broadcast again in 2005. A single twenty-four-minute original video animation (OVA) episode was released by VAP on April 21, 2005. It takes place somewhere within the timespan of episode eleven of the original TV series. The anime's opening theme song is "Lilium" performed by opera singer Kumiko Noma and is sung in Latin, with lyrics extracted from biblical passages and Christian sources, including the Book of Psalms, the Epistle of James, the Kyrie prayer, and the hymn "Ave mundi spes Maria". The ending theme song is "Be Your Girl" by Chieko Kawabe. The series was released on Blu-ray in Japan on December 19, 2012.

The anime was licensed by ADV Films in the US in 2004 and was released on DVD in 2005. ADV Films said the series was one of their bestselling and "most notorious" releases of 2005. During the Anime Boston 2006 (May 26–28) convention, ADV Films also announced the distribution rights of the OVA for release in the United States. However, the OVA was never released on television and was not included with the box set released by ADV Films in November 2006 or in the "Complete Collection" DVDs released in June 2009 and December 2011. When ADV Films divided their assets, Elfen Lied was remained with them and in-print. A Blu-ray Disc box set (as well as a new DVD set) was released on September 3, 2013, by ADV and Section23 Films, making it the only Blu-ray release under the ADV brand, and contains the never-before released OVA. In Australia, the series was licensed by Madman Entertainment.

The series was aired in the United Kingdom on Propeller TV (Sky) as part of Anime Network's short-lived launch in the United Kingdom. The series was aired uncut despite stricter censorship standard imposed by OFCOM on UK cable TV. The Anime Network is streaming the series On Demand in English, German, and French. The DVD box set released by ADV Films confirms that the series has a rating of TV-MA SV; the Canadian rating is 14A.

In a post to the now defunct official Adult Swim message board in April 2006, Adult Swim programming director Kim Manning revealed that despite the series' high level of controversial content, the network actually inquired into the possibility of airing the series, as Manning was an avid fan herself and watched the entire series in one sitting. However, the channel's Broadcast Standards and Practices department would have required the series to be so extensively edited ("it would have been cut to shreds", she described in the post) in order to air that it would have been "unintelligible". Ultimately, Adult Swim decided not to air it to preserve and respect the original quality of the series.

Reception and legacy
Reviewing the first English omnibus volume of Elfen Lied, Anime UK News gave it an 8 out of 10 rating and noted that it is much more detailed than the anime adaptation by explaining what Diclonius are and showing more of the characters' inner thoughts. Although, they stated that the beginning of the anime had "more punch." Anime UK News criticized Okamoto's art as poor throughout the book, but enjoyed the extra unrelated stories included at the end. Comic Buzz called it a "great read from start to finish" and gave it a 9/10 rating. They felt the art style changed with the characters' emotions and said it reminded them variously of Neon Genesis Evangelion and the work of Junji Ito. Rai of TheOASG gave the omnibus a 3 out of 5 star rating, criticizing the art and fan service, and overall preferred the anime which she acknowledged having bias for.

Reception for the Elfen Lied anime was generally mixed to positive. Reviewers such as Tasha Robinson of Sci Fi Weekly and Theron Martin of Anime News Network praised Elfen Lied for its story and technical excellence in production quality, animation and color. Due to the many scenes of nudity and gore, Dominic Laeno of THEM Anime Reviews criticized the series as being "overly blatant." Martin criticized the anime for having "sub-par voice acting" in both the original Japanese audio track and the English dub of the series, although he gave it an "A−" rating for both language dubs. Martin also said that the series "ends abruptly with some loose ends to the story that could leave viewers unsatisfied," but also called it "a horror series of exceptional merit." Laeno called the series "a genuinely good watch." Stig Høgset, also of THEM Anime Reviews, called Elfen Lied "a very special show, good and bad parts taken into consideration."

The Duffer Brothers have cited Elfen Lied as an influence on their 2016 Netflix show Stranger Things. They said that Elfen Lied was like an "ultraviolent E.T." and noted that the character Eleven was inspired by the anime. The Duffer Brothers also cited the influence of Akira, which they felt had in turn influenced Elfen Lied.

On June 12, 2015, the Chinese Ministry of Culture listed Elfen Lied among 38 anime and manga titles banned in China.

Notes

References

External links

Official VAP anime website 
Official Madman Entertainment anime website

Elfen Lied
2002 manga
2004 anime television series debuts
2005 anime OVAs
ADV Films
AT-X (TV network) original programming
Arms Corporation
Biopunk anime and manga
Bioterrorism in fiction
Bullying in fiction
Censored television series
Dark Horse Comics titles
Dark fantasy anime and manga
Discrimination in fiction
Domestic violence in fiction
Fiction about familicide
Murder in television
Television shows about telekinesis
Madman Entertainment anime
Mass murder in fiction
Anime and manga about revenge
Seinen manga
Sentai Filmworks
Shueisha franchises
Shueisha manga
Splatterpunk
Television censorship in China
Television shows set in Kamakura
Works about murder
Works about rape
Works about sexual abuse
Works about sexual harassment
Works about torture
Works banned in China
Works banned in Russia
Fiction about animal cruelty
Works about abuse